The 2014 Inter Island Cup was the final edition of the Indonesian Inter Island Cup, the football pre-season tournament of Indonesia. The date of the tournament was from 18 January 2014 to 1 February 2015. The final round was postponed to an unknown time because the police didn't give permission, concerning the vicious rivalries between the club's supporters.

Venues
The venues for the 2014 Inter Island Cup were in Manahan Stadium, Surakarta and Kanjuruhan Stadium, Malang Regency. Gelora Sriwijaya Stadium, Palembang was the venue for the final.

Qualification

Qualification took place from 10 to 16 January 2014. It involved the 22 Indonesia Super League teams. The tournament was divided into four zones. All zones were played in a round-robin tournament format except for the Sumatra zone.

The Kalimantan and Sulawesi-Papua zones were divided into two group each filled with four teams, with the top two teams in each zone qualifying for the tournament proper. For the Sumatra zone followed by Sriwijaya and Semen Padang, they played home-and-away system, with the winner qualifying for the tournament proper. For the Java zone, the 12 participating clubs were divided into three groups of four with the round robin system, and the winner from each group entered the tournament proper.

Qualified teams

Draw
The draw for the final tournament as well as the qualification tournament took place on 30 December 2013.

Squads

Each team named a minimum of 18 players in their squads (three of whom were goalkeepers) by the deadline that Liga Indonesia determined was on 7 January 2014. Injury replacements were allowed until 24 hours before the team's first match.

Final tournament
Played from 18 to 22 January 2014.

Group stage

Tie-breaking criteria
Ranking in each group shall be determined as follows:
Greater number of points obtained in all group matches;
Result of the direct match between the teams in question;
Goal difference in all group matches;
Greater number of goals scored in all group matches. 
If two or more teams are equal on the basis on the above four criteria, the place shall be determined as follows:
Kicks from the penalty mark if the teams in question are still on the field of play;
Drawing of lots by the Organising Committee.

Group A
All matches were played in Malang Regency on 18 – 21 January 2014.
Times listed are UTC+7.

Group B
All matches were played in Surakarta on 19 – 22 January 2014.
Times listed are UTC+7.

Final

Final match was played in Palembang on 1 February 2015.

Broadcasters

Goalscorers

Top Scorers

Notes

Own Goals

References

External links

 
Inter
Indonesian Inter Island Cup tournaments